is a railway station on the Hakodate Main Line in Niki, Yoichi District, Hokkaido, Japan, operated by Hokkaido Railway Company (JR Hokkaido). The station is numbered "S19".

Lines

Station layout
The station has a single side platform. Kitaca is not available. The station is unattended.

Adjacent stations

History
By 28 June 1903, the track had been extended north from Ranshima to Otaru Chūō (now ). After the Hokkaido Railway was nationalized on 1 July 1907, Japanese Government Railways (JGR) took over control of Yoichi station. On 12 October 1909 the station became part of the Hakodate Main Line. On 1 April 1987, with the privatization of Japanese National Railways (JNR), the successor of JGR, the station came under the control of JR Hokkaido. From 1 October 2007, station numbering was introduced on JR Hokkaido lines, with Niki Station becoming "S19".

See also
 List of railway stations in Japan

References

Railway stations in Hokkaido Prefecture
Railway stations in Japan opened in 1902